Cyanophycin synthase (L-aspartate-adding) (CphA, CphA1, CphA2, cyanophycin synthetase, multi-L-arginyl-poly-L-aspartate synthase) is an enzyme with systematic name cyanophycin:L-aspartate ligase (ADP-forming). This enzyme catalyses the following chemical reaction

 ATP + [L-Asp(4-L-Arg)]n + L-Asp  ADP + phosphate + [L-Asp(4-L-Arg)]n-L-Asp

This enzyme requires Mg2+ for activity. All enzymes known to have this activity also catalyze the addition of arginine, i.e. cyanophycin synthase (L-arginine-adding) activity. It is structurally similar to Muramyl ligases.

References

External links 
 

EC 6.3.2